Middle College High School is a high school in Seattle, Washington. Established on January 30, 1990, the main goal of Middle College High School is to give underserved and underrepresented students a second chance at earning their high school diploma.

Location
Middle College High School had four locations in Seattle but the school district shut down High Point School for Social Justice in the summer of 2015:
Middle College at High Point Center (now closed) – 6400 Sylvan Way S.W.
Northgate Mall Academy – 401 N.E. Northgate Way
Middle College at Seattle University – , temporarily located at the American Indian Heritage center. Slated to move to Seattle University in autumn 2012.
Ida B. Wells School for Social Justice – University of Washington

Former Locations

Middle College at American Indian Heritage – 1330 N. 90th St.

Notable alumni
Quincy Jones, comedian

References

External links
Middle College High School: About Our Programs

High schools in King County, Washington
Schools in Seattle
1990 establishments in Washington (state)
Educational institutions established in 1990